Hadha min fadli Rabbi is an Arabic phrase whose translation in English nears "This, by the Grace of my Lord," or "This is by the Grace of my Lord." Generally speaking, the phrase is most often used to convey a sense of humility and most importantly, gratitude to God for having something, be it material or spiritual, or otherwise, such as a talent one may possess, or good health, good income, a good spouse, children, etc.

When uttered by someone, it serves as a reminder that all things are from God alone, and thus, this phrase serves as a way to convey that all credit is due unto to him alone. Additionally, it also serves as a way to express gratitude and appreciation of God for the thing possessed, given, or owned by the person. In this sense, the phrase is closely related to another Arabic term, namely, Alhamdulillah, which conveys the idea of "All praise be to God," or even, "Thank God," as it is most often understood by Muslims and non-Muslim Arabs.

Although this phrase is generally observed to be used by Arabs (both Muslim and non-Muslim), non-Arab Muslim operators of the phrase also display its usage, especially those closely familiar with the Qur'an and those that possess a relatively simple and basic understanding of the Arabic language, given that the phrase is extracted from the Qur'an.

History of the phrase 

This phrase comes from a verse of the Holy Qur'an in which it forms only a small part of the entire verse. In verse 40 of the 27th chapter (sura) of the Qur'an, or The Ant, a story is related of the Prophet Solomon's interactions with Bilqis, also known as The Queen of Sheba. (See related article Islamic view of Solomon for the background of this story.)

Below is the translation by Abdullah Yusuf Ali of verses 38–42 of the above-mentioned chapter.

Use of the phrase in graphics, calligraphy, and products 
The phrase, has been featured in Islamic art and calligraphy as a phrase of importance and significance to Muslims. It is also featured on small gifts, such as greetings cards and rectangular magnets.

See also
 Alhamdulillah
 Arabic alphabet
 Arabic literature
 List of Arabic phrases
 Islamic view of Solomon
 Islamic art
 The Queen of Sheba
 Islamic calligraphy
 Qur'an

Sources 
 https://web.archive.org/web/20081225002128/http://www.al-islam.org/Quran/

Arabic words and phrases
Islamic terminology